Simeon Spafard was a member of the Wisconsin State Assembly.

Biography
Spafard was born on January 26, 1812. He died on March 3, 1880.

Career
Spafard was a member of the Assembly during the Session of 1854. He was a Democrat.

References

Democratic Party members of the Wisconsin State Assembly
1812 births
1880 deaths
19th-century American politicians